H+ or h+ may refer to:

Science and technology
 Electron hole, h+ the conceptual opposite of an electron 
 Evolved High Speed Packet Access, H+ mobile phone icon 
 Hydron (chemistry), H+ a cationic form of atomic hydrogen

Other
 H (S-train), a rail service in Copenhagen, Denmark
 H+: The Digital Series, a science-fiction web series
 H+ (album), a 2018 solo album by Jean-Benoît Dunckel
 Humanity+, an international organisation and magazine that advocates transhumanism
 Transhumanist Party, whose symbol is H+